Bikaner West Assembly constituency is one of the 200 constituencies of Rajasthan Legislative Assembly. This territory comes under Bikaner (Lok Sabha constituency).

Bikaner West Constituency covers all voters from parts of Bikaner tehsil, which include Bikaner Municipal Cooperation wards, 1 to 4, 14 to 19, 21, 29 to 35, 44 to 49 and 53 to 55, and Karmisar of ILRC Bikaner.

Dr BD Kalla, the current representative of this constituency, is Cabinet Minister of Energy, Public Health Engineering, Ground Water, Art, Culture & Archeology departments in Rajasthan Government since last week of December 2018.

Members of the Legislative Assembly

References

See also 
 Member of the Legislative Assembly (India)

Bikaner district
Assembly constituencies of Rajasthan